Stricticomus is a genus of beetles in the family Anthicidae, living in Eurasia, Madagascar and North America.

Species:
 Stricticomus araxicola Reitter, 1889 
 Stricticomus arcuaticeps Pic, 1900

References

Anthicidae